Confessin' is an album by the American jazz saxophonist John Stubblefield recorded in 1984 and released on the Italian Soul Note label.

Reception
The Allmusic review by Ken Dryden awarded the album 4 stars stating "John Stubblefield has made relatively few recordings as a leader during his long career, but it isn't because the saxophonist isn't deserving... This top-notch CD is well worth acquiring".

Track listing
All compositions by John Stubblefield except as indicated
 "Spiral Dance" - 5:08 
 "Waltz for Duke Pearson" (Cecil Bridgewater) - 4:47 
 "Blood Count" (Billy Strayhorn) - 6:33 
 "More Fun" - 4:10 
 "Dusk to Dawn" - 7:48 
 "Whisper" (Mulgrew Miller) - 4:06 
 "Confessin'" - 9:02 
Recorded at the Vanguard Studios in New York City on September 18 & 21, 1984

Personnel
John Stubblefield – tenor saxophone, soprano saxophone
Cecil Bridgewater - trumpet, flugelhorn
Mulgrew Miller – piano
Rufus Reid – bass
Eddie Gladden – drums

References

Black Saint/Soul Note albums
1984 albums